Bojan Gočanin (born 11 October 1997) is a Serbian footballer who plays for Sloga Kraljevo on loan from Metalac Gornji Milanovac.

Club career
Born in Vrnjačka Banja, Bojan's surname originating from the Goč mountain. He started his career with Radnički Kragujevac as a centre-back. He was also called into Serbia national under-17 football team, and was nominated for the best youth sportsmen of Kragujevac ending of 2013. Later he played with youth teams of BSK Borča and OFK Beograd.

Metalac Gornji Milanovac
Gočanin joined Metalac Gornji Milanovac at the beginning of 2016, where he ended his youth career. He passed the summer pre-season and started 2016–17 Serbian SuperLiga with te first team. He made his senior debut for the club in opening match of the season against Borac Čačak, played on 23 July 2016, replacing Nemanja Mladenović in the 54th minute of the game.

Career statistics

Club

References

External links
 
 

1997 births
Living people
People from Vrnjačka Banja
Association football midfielders
Serbian footballers
FK Radnički 1923 players
FK BSK Borča players
OFK Beograd players
FK Karađorđe Topola players
FK Metalac Gornji Milanovac players
FK Sloga Kraljevo players
Serbian SuperLiga players